Ekspress is a series of Russian satellites.

Expres (also Ekspres) is a newspaper based in Lviv, Ukraine.

Ekspress, Ekspres, or Expres may also refer to:

 Ekspress (satellite bus), a satellite bus designed by ISS Reshetnev
 Eesti Ekspress, an Estonian newspaper
 Ekspres Lviv, a Ukrainian hockey team
 Cluj Expres, a Romanian newspaper
 Rádio Expres, a Slovakian radio station

See also
 EXPRES, the Extreme Precision Spectrograph, an instrument used in searching for exoplanets
 List of Ekspress satellites
 Express (disambiguation)